Joe Boston, professionally known as stage name Shallou, is a Los Angeles-based singer, producer, and environmentalist, who produces ambient, house melodies with soulful vocals that have carved a niche in the Indie and Electronic music scenes. His debut EP, All Becomes Okay, was released in May 2017, followed by EP Souls in April 2018, both through his own label, Sleeptalker. Shallou was signed by Island Records in 2019 and released his debut album, Magical Thinking in early 2020.

Early life
Boston grew up in Rockville, Maryland with a family of intense music lovers. His dad was all about music discovery, playing Radiohead and Wilco to him when he was a kid. He was first inspired by singer James Blake and producer Gold Panda when he was around 16, combining elements of those artists into his own sound. After attending college at Loyola University New Orleans, he moved to Chicago to continue producing music. Boston currently resides in Los Angeles.

Career

2014–present
Shallou began his career during late 2014, and since then has been vastly noticed by the likes of Billboard, Sirius XM, The Fader, Complex, Spin, Indie Shuffle and Hype Machine. Shallou's 2016 singles "Heights" and "Doubt" have also received heavy rotation on multiple streaming platforms. In 2017, Shallou released his first cover, "Motion Picture Soundtrack". Shallou has released two Spotify Singles, "Begin" and a cover of Francis and the Lights "Friends", which he arranged and recorded with a string quartet at Spotify's offices in New York. He also released his debut EP, All Becomes Okay, available on all streaming services, as well as for download directly on Shallou's website, with 100% of its profit going to the Environmental Defense Fund. He has toured numerous times in every major US market, as well as a 2018 Europe tour. In March 2019, it was announced Shallou would perform at Coachella, Lollapalooza, Life is Beautiful and Outside Lands music festivals. Additionally, Shallou has played Red Rocks Amphitheater, Electric Forest, Firefly Music Festival, BUKU Music + Arts Project, amongst others. By early 2020 Shallou garnered over 350 million streams with the release of his debut album, Magical Thinking, featuring collaborations from The Knocks as well as vocalists Daya and Ashe.

On September 15, 2021, Shallou released "Heartaches", co-written by Elderbrook. On October 22, 2021, Shallou released the single "High Tide", his second single of 2021.

Associated acts
Shallou performs live trio, touring with many similar artists such as Petit Biscuit, Honne, Roosevelt, Basecamp, El Ten Eleven, and Big Gigantic.

Discography

Album

Extended play

Singles

As lead artist

As featured artist

Covers

Remixes

Tracks

Published tracks

References

External links
 

21st-century American musicians
American DJs
American electronic musicians
Living people
Musicians from New Orleans
Record producers from Louisiana
Year of birth missing (living people)
Electronic dance music DJs